Aleš Vodseďálek (5 born March 1985 in Jilemnice) is a Czech Nordic combined skier who has competed since 2003.

Career

Competing in two Winter Olympics, Vodseďálek earned his best finish of eighth twice (4 x 5 km team: 2006, 2010). His best finish at the FIS Nordic World Ski Championships was sixth in the 4 x 5 km team event at Liberec in 2009 while his best individual finish was 31st in the individual large hill event at those same games.

His best World Cup finish was eighth in a 4 x 5 km team event at Germany in 2009 while his best individual finish was 23rd in an individual large hill event at Finland that same year.

References

1985 births
Living people
People from Jilemnice
Czech male Nordic combined skiers
Nordic combined skiers at the 2006 Winter Olympics
Nordic combined skiers at the 2010 Winter Olympics
Olympic Nordic combined skiers of the Czech Republic
Sportspeople from the Liberec Region